Toy Story 3 (Original Motion Picture Soundtrack) is the soundtrack album to Disney/Pixar's 2010 film of the same name. The score was composed by recurrent Pixar composer Randy Newman, who also scored for the previous instalments in the franchise. The score album, featuring an original song "We Belong Together" performed by Newman, and instrumental tracks were released on June 14, 2010 by Walt Disney Records. The track "You've Got a Friend in Me" from the first instalment is also featured in the album, performed by The Gipsy Kings.

The album was initially released through digital download in lossy formats such as MP3 and AAC, and was not released in CD; the second time, where a Pixar film soundtrack was not released through physical formats, the first being Up. In January 2012, Intrada released the album on CD. The score received positive critical reception, and had won the Grammy Award for Best Score Soundtrack for Visual Media, while "We Belong Together" won the Academy Award for Best Original Song.

Development 
The track "We Belong Together" was initially planned as a duet song, featuring popular singers Lady Gaga or Katy Perry, and John Mayer performing the track. But Pixar decided against doing so, and instead wanted him to sing the track as "to retain that consistency" as he voiced for the songs in the first two instalments.

In a 2015 interview, Newman recalled that he was unhappy with the director Lee Unkrich, on using the temporary version of the score. He said that, "The movie did great and everything, and maybe I'm wrong and if I look back on it I won't know the difference – but it didn't fit hand in glove the way I would have tried to do – and he fell in love with the [temporary score] very much". He further rejected the offer for composing, Unkrich's Coco (2017), which later went to Michael Giacchino.

Track listing

Additional music 
In addition to the tracks included in the soundtrack album, the film also uses several other tracks such as "Dream Weaver" by Gary Wright, "Le Freak" by Chic, and Randy Newman's original version of "You've Got a Friend in Me". Furthermore, tracks "Cowboy!" and "Come to Papa" included material from Newman's rejected score to Air Force One. The song "Losing You" from Newman's own album Harps and Angels was also used in the first trailer for the film. The Judas Priest song "Electric Eye" was also used in the film in the temp score for the opening scene of Toy Story 3.

Toy Story Favorites 
In 2010, Walt Disney Records released a special soundtrack titled Toy Story Favorites, that included songs from the previous Toy Story soundtracks. The tracks "We Belong Together" and Gipsy Kings' version of "You've Got a Friend in Me" were featured in the album.

Chart positions

Accolades

References 

Album chart usages for Mexico
2010 soundtrack albums
Pixar soundtracks
Walt Disney Records soundtracks
Randy Newman soundtracks
Toy Story
Film scores
Animated film soundtracks
Comedy-drama film soundtracks
Grammy Award for Best Score Soundtrack for Visual Media